The 2015 Copa del Rey Juvenil was the 65th staging of the Copa del Rey Juvenil de Fútbol. The competition began on May 17, 2015 and ended on the week of June 27 with the final at the Estadio Alfonso Murube in Ceuta.

First round

The top two teams from each group and the two best third-placed teams are drawn into a two-game best aggregate score series. The first leg was played on May 17 and the return leg on May 24.

 
 
 
 
 
 
 
 
|}

Quarterfinal

The eight winners from the first round advance to quarterfinal for a two-game series best aggregate score with the first leg will be played on May 31 and the return leg on June 7.

|}

Semifinal

The four winners play a two-game series best aggregate score beginning the week of June 14 and returning the week of June 21.

|}

Final

The semifinal winners play a one-game final at the Estadio Alfonso Murube in Ceuta beginning the week of June 28.

Details

See also
2014–15 División de Honor Juvenil de Fútbol

References

Copa del Rey Juvenil de Fútbol
Juvenil